Friedrich Kriehuber (sometimes Bedřich or Fritz Kriehuber; 7 June 1834 in Vienna – 12 October 1871 in Vienna) was an Austrian draftsman, lithographer and woodcut artist.

Life and work 
He was the son of Josef Kriehuber, a well-known portrait painter and lithographer. Beginning in 1848, he attended the Academy of Fine Arts, Vienna. Initially, he was a landscape painter but later turned to portraits and, as an employee of his father, lithography.

Many of his works were published by Eduard Hallberger as illustrations for his magazine Über Land und Meer (Over Land and Sea). A year after Kriehuber's death, some of his lithographs appeared in Das jahr 1848. Geschichte der Wiener revolution (a two volume history of the Vienna Uprising) by Heinrich Reschauer and Moritz Smetazko, known as "Moritz Smets" (1828-1890).

He suffered from chronic health problems for most of his life and died of a pulmonary disorder at the Austrian Hydrotherapy Institute, shortly after being appointed a Professor at the Theresian Military Academy.

Selected lithographs

References

Further reading 
 Friedrich von Boetticher: Malerwerke des 19. Jahrhunderts. Beitrag zur Kunstgeschichte, Vol. 1, 1895, S. 769 (part of the article on "Josef Kriehuber") Reissued by Schmidt and Gunther (1979)

External links 

1834 births
1871 deaths
Austrian lithographers
Artists from Vienna
Academy of Fine Arts Vienna alumni
Deaths from lung disease